Stanley Rimsky Salgado (born 12 September 1980), known by his stage name Imposs, is a Haitian-Canadian rapper based in Quebec. Before becoming a solo artist, he was part of Muzion, one of the well-known hip hop bands of Quebec. He has collaborated on many occasions with Wyclef Jean during Muzion days and as a solo artist. He is also well known for dubbing the phrase "Real City" for Montreal. He is signed to Sony.

As part of Muzion
As part of band Muzion that was formed in 1999, Imposs had great success with the band signing a contract with BMG. The debut album Mentalité Moune Morne in 1999 was a hit and Imposs became well known in the urban scene throughout Canada and in Quebec in particular. After winning the "Album of the Year - Hip Hop" Félix Award, the band released their second album J'Rêvolutionne that got critical acclaim and again won the "Best Album of the Year -Hip Hop" in 2002. Imposs and Muzion toured France with IV My People, follow-up to the cult band NTM. In 2004, Wyclef Jean invited Muzion to collaborate with him on Wyclef Jean's hit 24 Heures à vivre. The francophone hit of Wyclef Jean witnessed huge success in France and internationally about the life of immigrants. The song won the "Prix Mirroir de la chanson d'expression française" (the Mirror Prize for song in French expression).

Solo career
Imposs launched his solo career with an album entitled Mon Poing D'Vue through K'Maro's music label K-Pone Inc with coverage in the Quebec media including interview at TQS.

He took part in "Festival d'Eté du Quebec" that called him "widely respected and most influential performer on the Quebec hip hop scene"

His first single / video release  was "Faut qu'j'men aille" released in 2007. He followed that with another single release called Rien d'interdit also in 2007. Rapper K-Maro appears in the video as a cameo.

When on 11 August 2008, Freddy Villanueva, an 18-year-old, lost his life by Montreal police bullets, and as a result riots ensued in Montreal-Nord district with a large concentration of minorities. Imposs was one of the first to intervene and was interviewed by the Quebec media as one of the opinion leaders presenting the Haitian and other minority communities. He also explained the grievances in Montreal's La Presse daily newspaper on 13 August 2008. Television stations held interviews with him about the incidents on Radio-Canada and RDI 24-hours news channel.

Imposs's new album Peace-Tolet debuted at number 76 on the Canadian Albums Chart.

Nominations and awards

During the period with Muzion:
Nominated "Best singer-songwriter" at ADISQ Awards (2000)
Winner of "Album of the Year - Hip Hop" for Mentalité Moune Morne at ADISQ Awards in 2000
Winner of "Album of the Year - Hip Hop" for J'Rêvolutionne at ADISQ Awards in 2003

As a solo act:
Nominated for "Album of the Year" for his album Mon Poing d'vue at the ADISQ Awards in 2008
Nominated for "Song of the Year" for his single Rien d'interdit at the Sounds of Blackness S.O.B.A Gala in 2008
Winner of "Francophone Album of the Year" for debut solo album Mon Poing d'vue at the Sounds of Blackness S.O.B.A Gala in 2008
Winner of "French language Revelation of the Year" at the S.O.B.A gala in 2009
Nominated for "Best Artist or Group - Francophone" at the S.O.B.A gala in 2009
Nominated for "Best Francophone Video Clip of the Year" with Taktika for his song Au nom de qui? at S.O.B.A in 2009 in addition to nomination for "Best Francophone Collaboration of the Year" for the same song for Imposs and Taktika
Winner of "S.O.B.A Public Choice Award" at the Sounds of Blackness S.O.B.A Gala in two consecutive years 2008 and 2009 voted via the Canadian music station MusiquePlus
Winner of "Best Artist or Group - Frnacophone of the Year" during S.O.B.A gala in 2009

For 2 consecutive years (2008 and 2009), rapper Imposs won the prize for "Best francophone artist of the year", during the Quebec Sounds of Blackness Awards (S.O.B.A) specializing in urban and hip hop culture. The award is the most prestigious distributed annually.

Festivals and Shows
Imposs has given more than 300 shows throughout Canada and in France. He notably is featured in a number of well-attended festivals including:

Coup de Coeur Francophone - 1999
Les FrancoFolies de Montréal - 1999, 2000, 2002, 2004, 2008
Festival d'été de Québec - 2000, 2004, 2008, 2009
Festival de Musique Émergente -2008

Collaborations
Imposs has collaborated with a number of artists. However the most notable remains with another international artist of Haitian origin Wyclef Jean. It started when Imposs was in Muzion. In 2004 Wyclef Jean invited the band to collaborate with him on Wyclef Hean's hit 24 Heures à vivre. The francophone hit of Wyclef Jean witnessed huge success in France and internationally and went to win the "Prix Mirroir de la chanson d'expression française" (the Mirror Prize for song in French expression).
 
In the remix of Wyclef Jean's hit Let Me Touch Your Button Imposs is featured alongside will.i.am (of The Black Eyed Peas) and Jimmy O. (of Rap Kreyol)

Imposs is also featured in K'Maro's song Love It Or Leave It appearing in the latter's 2008 album Perfect Stranger

Discography

Albums

With Muzion
The albums were released under the "VIK Recordings" music label:
Mentalité Moune Morne (1999)
J'Rêvolutionne (2002)

Solo
The album was released under K.Pone Inc music label:
Mon Poing D'Vue (2007)

Tracks:
 Intro (Les rideaux s'ouvrent)
 Rien d'interdit
 Mornier 4 Life
 Faut qu'j'm'en aille (Bonnie and Clyde '07)
 Dope Boys
 Monte mes gardes
 La preuve morte
 Mwen te mouri
 Vive la différence
 Tu piges
 Strip tip
 Chlamedia
 Ça fait longtemps
 Du fond du coeur

PeaceTolet (2012)

Tracks:
Qu'1 modeste journée (avec Cim-City)
Ouvrez le feu (avec J.Kyll)
Le même tralala
Donnez-moi une chance
À toi de briller (avec Alfa Rococo)
L'erreur est humaine // L'amour est égoiste (avec Audrey Joelle)
2e souffle (avec France D'Amour & Sans Pression)
À 7 instant (avec Barnev)
Le coeur comme métronome (avec Bambi Cruz & Mc Solaar)
Tu veux qu'on 100 barres ?
On s'évade
Enfermé dans ma liberté (avec Corneille)
Richesse Québécoise (avec Eddy King & Izra L)
Tu l'auras, tue l'Aura
SeXorcisme (avec Mackadamion)
C'est ça ma vie

Singles / Videos
2007: "Rien d'interdit" 
2008: "Faut qu'j'men aille" 
2008: "Vive la différence"
2009: "Monte mes gardes"

References

External links
Imposs MySpace page
Imposs Rap Kreyol MySpace page
Preste.ca Imposs page

1980 births
Living people
Haitian emigrants to Canada
Haitian Quebecers
Canadian male rappers
Musicians from Montreal
20th-century Canadian male musicians
21st-century Canadian male musicians
20th-century Canadian rappers
21st-century Canadian rappers